The Wuvulu-Aua language is spoken on Wuvulu and Aua Islands by speakers scattered around the Manus Province of Papua New Guinea. Although the Wuvulu-Aua language has a similar grammatical structure, word order, and tense to other Oceanic languages, it has an unusually complex morphology.

Wuvulu Island is located in the Papua New Guinea Manus Province and reaches about 10 feet above sea level. As a member of the Admiralty Islands, the Wuvulu and Aua islands are a part of the Bismarck Archipelago that includes other provinces such as the New Ireland province, the East New Britain province, the Morobe province and much more. Wuvulu is spoken by an estimated 1,600 people in the Manus Province. There are approximately 1,000 speakers of the language on Wuvulu and 400 on Aua. The remaining speakers of Wuvulu inhabit either the other islands located in the Papua New Guinea territory.

Wuvulu is most similar to Austronesian, Malayo-Polynesian, and other Oceanic languages scattered around the Admiralty Islands. Wuvulu-Aua is one of only three languages categorized in the Western subgroup of the Admiralty language. The other two languages are Seimat and Kaniet; however, Kaniet is now an extinct language.

There are three different dialects of Wuvulu that are unique to the different clans located on the island: the Onne dialect, the Auna dialect, and the Aua dialect which is native to the Aua island. Each dialect differs in phoneme, distinguishing them from each other. However, the individual islands Wuvulu and Aua have a lexical and phonological distinction.

Classification
The Wuvulu-Aua language is part of the Austronesian language family. After that, it belongs to Malayo-Polynesian, which is one of the major Nuclear Austronesian language families. Next, based on location, Wuvulu-Aua is in the Eastern Malayo-Polynesian family. If classified more explicitly, it is a member of the Oceanic Western Admiralty Island language family. In fact, Wuvulu-Aua is made up of two languages, Wuvulu and Aua. These two languages vary in the pronunciation of certain consonants like .

History
Most researchers believed that the Proto-Eastern Malayo Polynesian (PEMP) language was produced in the area called "Bird's Head", which is in the north-west island of New Guinea. Later, PEMP developed different descendent languages, of which Proto-Oceanic (PO) was one. PO not only reached to the northern coast of New Guinea and Indonesia, but also to Wuvulu, an island of the Bismarck archipelago. There are about thirty-one languages in the Admiralty subgroup of Oceanic languages that are derived from PO. Twenty-eight languages belong to the Eastern Admiralty subgroup and the other three languages (Wuvulu-Aua, Seimat and Kaniet) are in the Western Admiralty subgroup.

Demographic 
The ancestors of the Wuvulu people made ponds by digging holes and pouring in fresh water to plant hula and the great taro around the pond. Wuvulu people also planted sweet potato, tapioca, and cabbage in their gardens. Fishing is important to Wuvulu society and they have many different methods. One method is to have a group of women form a large half-circle with a fishing net while walking along the reef. The fish hide behind the rocks due to the movement of the tide and the women can easily catch them by lifting the stone. They mainly depend on bush when they are building houses or constructing a canoe. During the German colonial period, locals faced difficulties as the trees were cut down by Germans.

The people of Wuvulu often help each other build houses and gardens. Food is often cooked with coconut milk. It is taboo for the local people to eat coconut crab, shell-fish, and turtles even though some of them cannot refuse the allure of these foods. The population of Wuvulu was dramatically reduced at the end of the last century by malaria and other diseases spread by outsiders. At that time, at least 90% of the population died of foreign diseases. 
Christianity is very popular on the island; every Sabbath (Saturday), the residents gather to sing songs written in Hawaiian.

Sounds and phonology

Vowels
Wuvulu-Aua has three distinct dialects, two on Wuvulu island, and one on Aua island. The Auna dialect is spoken on Aua Island, while the Onne dialect is spoken on Wuvulu. The Wuvulu-Aua language has a very small phoneme inventory consisting of 20 phonemes. There are ten vowels; five vowels and five of their long counterparts, and 10 consonants. High, mid and low vowels are all spread fairly even in terms of frequency. High vowels are the most frequent and mid vowels are the least frequent.

There are five long vowels within the Wuvulu language. These five long vowel phonemes share the same phonetic quality as their standard vowel counterparts; however, they are longer in duration. In Wuvulu, there are 20 possible diphthongs of the five basic vowels discussed above. The terms rising, falling and level refer to the rise or fall of sonority of the diphthongs. Within Wuvulu, there are three vowel pairs that do not exist that are common in other languages. Eo, oe, and ae are three pairs that do not occur in Wuvulu. Previous research suggests that diphthongs are not phonemic in Wuvulu.

Consonants
Two publications, Blust 1996 and 2008, vary the number of consonant phonemes, reducing from 14 to 12. The third publication, Hafford 2012, further reduces the consonant phonemes to 10. There is one fricative  which is usually voiceless however when placed between vowels it can become voiced. There are no consonant clusters within the language.

All allophones are environmentally conditioned. The voiceless fricative  is sometimes voiced  -> . In rapid speech the voiceless fricative  is sometimes voiced   -> . Older generations of Wuvulu-Aua speakers still use the  phone. If  is adjacent to a [+high] vowel,  will become a voiced alveolar stop  ->  'child'. Wuvulu has four plural pronouns. For each of the plural pronouns,  can be deleted  ->  (Hafford, 2015, pg. 39). Conditioned variants  and  have been proposed by Blust 2008. All dialects of Wuvulu-Aua claim that  is not a phone as borrowed words from English replace  with ʔ.

Syllable structure
The syllable structure in Wuvulu is (C)V. This means that the vowel is the nucleus of the syllable and can be either a standard vowel, long vowel or a diphthong. The consonant, on the other hand, is optional. All vowels hold one mora of weight; however, long vowels and diphthongs hold two moras of weight.

Stress
If a syllable in Wuvulu contains a long vowel or diphthong, it is considered "heavy". Therefore, long vowels and diphthongs always carry stress. Similarly, stressed is considered to be linked to vowel length. If a syllable ends with a vowel that is short in length, then they have penultimate stress. Thus,  'sink' has penultimate stress because its final vowel is short in length. If a syllable ends with a vowel that is long in length or a diphthong, then it has ultimate stress;  'my village' has ultimate stress because its final vowel is long in length.

Morphosyntax
Proto-Oceanic is the ancestor of Wuvulu; though the grammatical structure of Wuvulu is similar, there are also differences. 
Proto-Oceanic noun-phrase sentence structure is as follows: art + (number/quantifier)+ noun + modifier + demonstrative. In Wuvulu, however, the noun-phrase sentence structure is: (art/demonstrative) + (number/quantifier) + modifiers + noun + modifier

Noun phrases 
Similar to Proto–Oceanic, nouns are categorized as personal, local and common. Personal nouns are nouns related to the speaker, such as kin terms or the personal names of people. Local nouns are names of places. All other nouns are common nouns like 'tree'. This category also includes words like 'under' (preposition).

Compounds, reduplication and onomatopoeia are the three ways to construct nouns. 
 Compounds are when two words combine together to form a new word.

Verb phrases 
Wuvulu has a single word that contains 20 morphemes (morphemes are the smallest unit of meaning in a language), which is the most complicated single verb among the 500 Oceanic languages. Verbs can be attached by subject and object clitics and can have added mood, aspect, completion, etc.

Example:

  

'to throw' 'throw it!' 'Throw the stone'

bound with object marker            The verb root takes the transitive  morpheme (-ca)
 When an intransitive word changes to a transitive word, the causative maker  must be added to the word.
Example:

  to  

'run' (transitive) 'make it run'  (intransitive) 
 When a noun changes to a verb, the suffix  has to be put at the end of the original word. If the verb is intransitive, then the marker  is used to change into transitive word.

Adverb 
There are six different adverb morphemes to describe verbs, including complete, frequent, infrequent, eventual, intensified, and sequential. (Note: these markers are prefixes.)
 The marker  describes actions done completely. 
 The marker  describes actions done frequently.
 The marker  describes actions done infrequently.
 The marker  describes actions done eventually. 
 The marker  describes actions done with strong emotion. 
 The marker  describes actions done prior to other actions.       
Wuvulu also has suffix adverbs.
 The marker  describe actions done within a limit, similar to only in English.       

Verbal clitics
"Pronominal clitics in Wuvulu are modified forms of free pronouns that are bound to the edges of verb stem." Verb clitics are able to be used as subjects, objects of a clause, or co-located in a clause with noun phrases.

Subject proclitics
Wuvulu is one of the few languages to have a structure similar for subject proclitics, which was thought to be exclusive to Proto-Oceanic. There are three possibilities as to where the Wuvulu subject proclitics are from. Example:

Clause structure 
Clause structure is divided into verbal clauses and verbless clauses. Verbless is constructed by two nouns that are close together. In this kind of sentence, pause 【，】 separated between the subject and predicate.  Ex： ia,futa ('He, (is a) chef'). According to Foley & Van Valin (1984) and Van Valin & LaPolla (1997), verbal clauses can be described with one model.

[ Clause [ Adjunct ] [ Core [Nucleus] ] Adjunct

Example:

Yesterday the PL man 3SG=Real-cast-have-TR the.PL tuna at sea
'Yesterday the men caught the tuna at sea.'

According to the model above:

[ Clause [ Adjunct ] [ Core [Nucleus] ] Adjunct
[           [ yesterday] [the men][ they=caught] the tuna] at sea

Syntax

Wuvulu, like the other 30 languages in the Admiralty Islands language family, is a subject–verb–object (SVO) language. However, it has a tendency towards verb–object–subject syntax because Wuvulu is very similar to Proto-Oceanic, in which verbal agreement marking and its propensity for the subject constituent are at the end of the sentence.

Verbless clauses 
 The predicate nominal is formed by two close noun phrases. Usually, the first noun phrase is the subject and the second is the predicate.
Example:

PRON.3SG chief
' He is a chief.'

 The predicate locative is formed when a noun is followed by a location noun.

Example:  
Pron.3SG PROPN
'He is there.'

Verbal clauses
 Existential clauses express the existence of something by using the verb , equivalent to there is in English. 
 Declarative clauses are used to denote a situation. (Note: realis and  irrealis mood will be used)  
Example:

3SG=REAL-work=3SG
'He did it.'

 Imperative clauses are a sentence without a subject, but a second-person subject is assumed. 
Example:

mi-to=nia!
DIR-get=3SG
'Come get it!'

 Deontic clauses are like imperative clauses but in a command form. 
Example:

2PL=DEON-go
'You must leave!'

Verbal morphology
Among the Oceanic languages, Wuvulu has one of the most complex morphologies. Unlike Proto-Oceanic, Wuvulu does not use derivational morphology. It gets verb derivation from nouns and adjectives. Wuvulu also gets transitive verbs from intransitive verbs.

To get verb derivation from nouns or adjectives (intransitive) and adjectives by adding a suffix (-i) to the noun or adjective.
A verb from noun creates a sentence that means 'to be [noun or adjective]' when adding -i. When the suffix is combined with the  prefix, the meaning of the sentence can be changed to 'to cause/let something become [noun or adjective]'. 

Example: 

'the stone'

3SG=REAL-stone-DER
'It is stone.'

3SG=REAL-CAUS-stone-DER-TR PRON.3DU
'She turned the two to stone.'

Intransitive verbs are formed from transitive verbs by adding the causative marker .

Example:

ʔi=na-poni
3SG=REAL-run
'He ran.'
ʔi=na-fa-poni=a
3SG=REAL-CAUS-run=3SG
'She made it run.'

Transitive
Transitive verbs can come from adjectives when adding the causative marker -fa. 
Example:

ʔi=na-fa-rawani=nia
3SG=REAL-CAUS-good=3SG
'He treated her well.'

ʔi=na-fa-afelo=ia
3SG=REAL-CAUS-bad=3SG
'He destroyed it (lit. caused it to be bad).'

Preverbal morphology
"Preverbal morphemes within the Wuvulu verb phrase, consists of positions for subject clitics, and inflectional prefixes denoting mood/aspect and direction".

Example: (SUBJECT=) (MOOD/ASPECT-) (DIRECTION-) VERB (-ADVERBIAL) (=OBJECT) (-DIRECTIONAL)

Generally, the Oceanic language family tends to have pre-verbal morphemes that are free or prefixed. But in Wuvulu, pre-verbal and post-verbal morphemes are bounded by the verb stem, except for subjects and objects, which can be free nominals, verbal clitics, or both.

Mood

Like Proto-Oceanic, Wuvulu also lacks a tense category. Though it lacks a tense category, it tends to use mood, aspect markers, and time phrases to express tenses.

The realis mood/marker inflection conveys past tense.

ro=na-biri=ʔia
3PL=REAL-work=3SG
'They did it.'

However, an irrealis mood/marker does not convey past tense.

ro=ʔa-biri=ʔia
3PL=IRR-work=3SG
'They are about to do it.'

Demonstratives 
Demonstratives (i.e. spatial deictics) are used to position tangible objects/persons concerning speech-act participants. Articles and third-person pronouns are heavily related to demonstratives in numerous languages. There are numerous variations including time or temporal deictics, among others, but spatial deictics are a particularly essential element of comprehensive communication. To interpret a deictic, one must consider the specific context in terms of who said it, where it was said, and who it was directed at, as these are uniquely context-dependent.

Wuvulu consists of demonstrative identifiers that allow for determining the proximity or spatial position in relation to the speaker. This is expressed by three forms, essential to determining the position in space of the subject, which is a concept inherited from Proto-Oceanic. As can be seen in table 1, the sequences  'close',  'far', and  'unspecified' are used to understand each specific context, using the distance in relation to the speaker. 

Broadly speaking, Oceanic languages utilise a three-way distinction between proximal, intermediate, and distal forms, but the way in which the distinction appears varies between languages.

(Notably,  refers to 'near' in spatial deictics, but is glossed as 'now' in a temporal context, and close anaphor in discourse reference. This alludes to the morphological complexity seen in Wuvulu.)

This tends to be the observed close geographical trend of languages using a three-way contrast, but Loniu, a language spoken on Manus island (a neighboring island in the Bismarck Archipelago) features a two-way contrast, and is one of the closest geographical neighbors to Wuvulu and Aua. This may be due to a variety of reasons, but it demonstrates the significant variation in influences impacting specific languages to result in the diversity seen today.

The demonstrative family of morphemes used in Wuvulu allows for many possible uses. Below is a table of the glossed translations of each plural form, including the distance of each spatial deictic.

As can be seen below, the plural demonstrative  is used to mark the plurality (people vs. singular person) through an unspecified distance; there is no particular distance in this context the speaker is trying to emphasize.

the       people             REAL-jump    on        boat
'the      people            boarded           the       ship'

Further, in the clearest sense, spatial deictics can be seen through speech acts from speaker to hearer, referring to proximity in space.

This can be seen in:

these    stars     REAL  very     light
'these   stars     are       very     bright'

where  is used to signify a particular constellation of stars that is close when compared to another constellation not explicitly stated here, but is being referenced.

Similarly,

those    star      REAL  bright
'those  stars     are       bright'

where , the plural demonstrative, is used to indicate a far distance, as 'those' stars are far, relative to another undefined group of stars.

These two examples allow for a clear demonstration of the requirement for spatial deictics, that they can be used to express the difference between relative spatial positioning.

While not a related language (and thus, not to be directly compared), this distinction occurs in English discourse through words like that or those, allowing for a depth of communication not otherwise available. These elements can be seen at work in the languages of the Oceanic region, and often follow similar patterns in terms of semantic organization to allow for these distinctions to be made.

Singular demonstrative identifiers and articles are modified in instances of animation, as well as spatial context. The below close demonstratives allow for determination of what is being referred to, whether inanimate or animate. It is interesting to note that plural identifiers of demonstratives in Wuvulu-Aua do not account for animation, and where animation is expressed, it is limited to humans or spiritual beings or deities with personality.

'this     father'

'this     canoe'

When discussing the living father, the  animate demonstrative is used, but for the inanimate canoe,  is used, showing a distinction for the living being. This distinction is not limited to close demonstratives, but is seen in far and unspecified distances also:

'that     father'

'that     canoe'

'the      father'

'the      canoe'

These distinctions are summarized in the table above, and allow the hearer to determine within the context what is being referred to, as given by the deictic that marks for animation and position in space. This allows for further depth of discourse within the language, and is an important process within language formation to allow for nuanced discourse.

Functions of demonstratives

Particular referents 
Demonstratives in Wuvulu can be referents and surround a noun phrase (NP) to emphasize it as the focus of the sentence. This is key as it allows for clarification in discourse and serves in identificiation purposes.

For example:

this      person this      REAL-marry    yesterday
'this      particular person  married      yesterday'

Pronominal demonstratives 
Demonstratives can also function in the position of a pronoun as NP arguments. They are in a phrase-initial position, with an adjectival modifier position before the head noun, when they used to be phrase-final. For example,  is the object of the verb in:

3PL-DEON-move-get-come-that
'They must fetch that (person).'

They can also be used post-verbally, working with the third person subject clitic = '3SG' or = '3PL', seen in these examples:

3SG=REAL-move-DIR that
'That (thing) came.'

3PL=REAL-move-DIR those
'Those (people/things) came.'

In discourse, pronominal demonstratives are not used very often as they are highly complex, and have limited situations for application.

Adverbial demonstratives 
Demonstratives can also act as adverbs to highlight the location of verbs. While adverbs function to provide additional information to a situation (i,e. location), combining these with spatial deictics allows for future clarification and accuracy within discourse. ʔi ‘at’ (prepositional) and iei ‘there’ are demonstrative morphemes that express location, as seen in the following examples:

3SG=REAL-put=3SG here
'He put it here.'

3PL=DEON-stay there
'They must stay there.'

3PL=DEON-stay there
'They must stay there (distant)'

The prepositional  is utilised before a locational form, to indicate things nearby or in the vicinity of the specific thing in question.

Negation 
Wuvulu negation can be broadly divided into verbal negation and clausal negation.

Verbal negation in Wuvulu takes the form of an inflectional morpheme. It occurs in the pre-stem position of the verb (the position occupied by inflections between the subject marker and the verb stem itself). Within the pre-stem position, the negation marker specifically occurs between the mood marker and the aspect marker. The location of the negation marker in the pre-stem position is show below.

The form  always occurs after the deontic morpheme, resulting in the form  'must not'. Below is an example of  negating a verb.  
{|
| (1) ||oma'oma'a ||fei ||tala
|ba
|ro-nei-'a-we-no-'ua-mai
|-
| ||rd-oma'a||the||road
|cmpz
|p-must-neg-ev-move-adv-come
|-
| || colspan="8" |'Watch the road so that they do not just come [and surprise us].'
|}

The marker  is always used with the irrealis mood, therefore falling after the irrealis marker , as in (2), to mark situations which were expected to occur, but have not.

{|
| (2) ||i-mina-1apa'a ||manumanu
|i-'a-ta-we-no-mai
|hinene
|-
| ||3s-adv-know
|thing
|3s-irr-neg-ev-move-come
|later
|-
| || colspan="7" |'He completely knows things that have not yet occurred (has the ability to

predict or divine).'
|}

This is used to refer to events that have not happened yet, and  alone simply refers to those that have not happened.

Clausal negation in Wuvulu can be further divided into clausal (the negation of an entire clause), and constituent (the negation of a particular constituent within a clause).
For clausal negation the word  occurs before the clause being negated. An example of this is found below.

{|
| (3) ||Lomi
|lagu-na-bigi-bigi
|suta
|-
| ||neg||3dl-real-rd-work
|taro garden
|-
| || colspan="6" |'The two were not working the taro garden.'
|}

For constituent negation,  can also function as a negator, as can the word . In both cases, the word occurs directly before the constituent being negated. Examples of each marker are below.

{|
| (4) ||Lomi
|na-'aida
|hara-na,
|yoi 
|ma'ua
|meni
|Beatau
|-
| ||neg||real-know
|name-3s
|2s
|but
|this
|propn
|-
| || colspan="10" |'You do not know his name, but this is Beatau.'
|}

{|
| (5) ||agu-a-di-poni 
|aba
|tafi-u
|meni
|ua
|hani'u
|-
|  ||ldl-irr-adv-run
|neg
|sister-ls
|this
|but
|demon
|-
|  || colspan="9" |'Let's leave. This isn't my sister, but (a) devil.'
|}

A negated clause using  is often coordinated by the conjunction  to a contrastive positive clause.

{|
| (6) ||ma
|agia
|aba
|ale- 'ei
|-
| ||and||no
|neg
|like- Pl
|-
| || colspan="7" |'But no—it's not like that.'
|}

Clausal and constituent negation are frequently used to express negative conditions, as seen twice in (7).

{|
| (7) ||ma
|naba
|lomi
|lagu-na-fi-siba-i
|lagu
|ei
|fi-tafi
|lomi
|i-ma-mara
|fei
|Haua
|-
| ||and||if
|neg
|3dl-real-rcpr-anger-hrm
|two
|the
|rcpr-sister-hrm
|neg
|3s-rd-dry
|the
|propn
|-
| || colspan="14" |'And if the two hadn't been cross— the two sisters, Haua wouldn't have been created.'
|}

It can be seen below in (8) in which it functions as a clausal negator. However, according to Hafford (1999), this free variation may require further research before it can be confirmed.

{|
| (8) ||lo'e
|fau-fau-na
|-
| ||neg||rd-power-3s
|-
| || colspan="5" |'He did not have power.'
|}

Possession 
Possession in Wuvulu can be indicated in two ways: either by a bound possessor suffix attached to the head noun of a noun phrase, or by juxtaposing noun phrases. The head noun always precedes the possessive marker/possessor, whether the possessor is indicated by the bound suffix, or by a juxtaposed noun phrase, as demonstrated in the examples in this section. Possessed nouns, as for other Oceanic languages, are classified in terms of either indirect or direct possession (similar to alienable or inalienable possession, respectively), with indirectly possessed nouns being divided further into three categories, as detailed below.

Possessor suffixes 
In the case of possessor suffixes, the suffix differs based on whether the possessor is first-, second- or third-person. These suffixes are only used when there is a single possessor – that is, they cannot be used in the case of more than one possessor (e.g. "their farm", where their indicates two or more people).

For a possessor suffix to be applied to an indirectly possessed noun, there are three possessum nouns ("classifiers") which must be used in the place of an explicit reference to the indirectly possessed object. Hafford (1999) states, "These classifiers act as nouns… taking quantifiers, articles and bound agreement suffixes." Accordingly, the possessor suffixes attach either to a directly possessed noun, or a classifier noun corresponding to an indirectly possessed object (e.g.: 'your taro' = 'your edible thing' = -). That is, indirectly possessed nouns can only take a possessor suffix when they are represented by a possessum noun. Hafford (2015) states, "The suffixed possessum noun is optionally followed by a more specific alienable noun as in,  'my food, taro'".

The category of directly possessed nouns includes body parts (except for genitalia) and names, as well as direct objects such as "familiar places (e.g., one's  'house'), and indispensable objects (such as  'canoe' and  'bush knife')." Possessor suffixes are also applied to kin terms, for instance, 'mother' , 'father' , and 'child' . As mentioned above, genitalia fall into the category of the general indirect possessum noun , contrary to other body parts, which are treated as directly possessed. This may be due to a desire to maintain modesty, allowing the speaker to refer to genitalia without explicitly referring to the particular body part.

The following table outlines the possession suffixes which can be utilised in Wuvulu:

See the examples below for a demonstration of the usage of the bound suffixes to indicate direct and indirect possession. The first two examples are for direct possession, for first- and second-person respectively. The third example is for indirect possession, for third-person.

For second person affixation, another example is provided (Hafford, 1999), using the directly possessed noun , 'work':

In the following example (Hafford, 1999), we see the third-person possessor suffix applied to the possessum noun for edible things.

Juxtaposed noun phrases 
Possession can be indicated by the juxtaposition of noun phrases. This method can be used to indicate possession by multiple possessors, as well as a single possessor. The condition that indirectly possessed nouns are represented by a possessum noun also holds for this method of indicating possession, and in such cases, "the classifier precedes the possessor noun phrase as in  'possession of theirs'", demonstrated in example (12) below. Example (12) also demonstrates the application of this method for multiple (dual, in this case) possessors (Hafford, 1999):

The method can also be applied for both direct and indirect possession. The possessed noun phrase precedes the possessor noun phrase, and multiple layers of possession can be embedded into one phrase. An example of this layering of possession in English is an expression such as "the house of the son of the doctor" (the doctor in "the son of the doctor", and the son in "the house of the son" are both possessors). An example from Wuvulu of layered possession is given below (Hafford, 1999):

Vocabulary
The Wuvulu phonemic inventory consists of 10 consonants, 10 vowels, and 10 diphthongs. Wuvulu diphthongs separate vowels phonetically, despite the fact that when spoken, the vowels create one phonetic sound  Within the Wuvulu language, the vowel "a" dominates as most common, having a one-third frequency in the language.
Wuvulu has two numerical systems, one for animate objects and one for inanimate objects. Both numerical systems are a senary, or base-6 numerical systems, where the numbers following six are multipliers of six.

There are several basic words that is stable and do not change hugely which include the words for 'blood', 'stone' and 'the sun'.   

Each number less than or equivalent to four is representative of the Proto-Oceanic language. Any number following four demonstrative of a multiplicative construct, similarly found in the Marshall Islands. Loosely translated, it means 'four multiply two'. Therefore,  translates to 'eight' in Wuvulu.

People and locations addressed must use proper nouns with the morpheme  added as a prefix to any name. The use of this prefix is not limited to proper nouns but can also be used for pronouns, such as when addressing a relative like "aunty", "sister", or "mother".

Wuvulu family names can either be based on the patriarch's name or clan names. Some family names are named after locations due to settlers associating locations with clan names.

Notes

References
 
Diessel, Holger (2013). Distance Contrasts in Demonstratives. In Dryer, Matthew S. & Haspelmath, Martin (eds.) The World Atlas of Language Structures Online. Leipzig: Max Planck Institute for Evolutionary Anthropology. Available online at http://wals.info/chapter/41
 
 
Himmelmann, Nikolaus (1996). Demonstratives in Narrative Discourse: A Taxonomy of Universal uses. University of Koln. pp. 205 – 243.
Ross, Malcom (2004). Demonstratives, local nouns and directional in Oceanic languages: a diachronic perspective. National Library of Australia. pp. 175 – 200.

Further reading

External links 
 Kaipuleohone's Robert Blust collection includes written materials and audio recordings of Wuvulu
 Two additional Wuvulu texts are archived in Kaipuleohone (JH1-001, JH1-002)
 Paradisec has a collection of Wuvulu texts, stories and songs from PNG from James Hafford
 Paradisec has several other collections that include Wuvulu materials

Admiralty Islands languages
Languages of Manus Province